Susana Canales Niaucel (5 September 1933 – 22 March 2021) was a Spanish film and television actress. Initially a child actor she switched to playing grown-up parts in the early 1950s. She starred in the 1951 drama Black Sky (1951).

Canales died on 22 March 2021 in her hometown, Madrid, at the age of 87 from natural causes.

Selected filmography
 White Horse Inn (1948)
 Black Sky (1951)
 Such is Madrid (1953)
 The Adventures of Gil Blas (1956)
 Return to the Truth (1956)
 Count Max (1957)
 John Paul Jones (1959)
 Revolt of the Mercenaries (1961)

References

Bibliography
 Bentley, Bernard. A Companion to Spanish Cinema. Boydell & Brewer, 2008.

External links
 

1933 births
2021 deaths
Spanish film actresses
Actresses from Madrid
Spanish child actresses
Expatriate actresses in the United States
Spanish expatriates in the United States